Melkamu "Mel" Taufer (born 8 February 1998) is an Ethiopian-born Italian football player. He plays for Fasil Kenema.

Club career

Internazionale

Loan to Arzachena 
On 18 July 2017, Taufer was signed by Serie C side Arzachena with a season-long loan deal. On 7 October, Taufer made his professional debut in Serie C for Arzachena and he scored his first professional goal in the 26th minute of a 4–1 away win over Gavorrano, he was replaced by Simone Sbarella in the 64th minute. Taufer ended his season-long loan deal with only 9 appearances, 5 as a starter, 1 goal and 1 assist, but he neven played an entire match for the club.

Arzachena 
After the loan, on 17 July 2018, Taufer joined to Serie C club Arzachena with an undisclosed fee.

Fasil Kenema 
After years away from Ethiopia, Taufer has returned to his hometown by signing Ethiopian Premier League club Fasil Kenema for a year. He won the league and best player of the tournament scoring 17 goals in 24 appearances.

International career 
Taufer represented Italy at Under-16 and Under-17 level. On 2 October 2012 he made his U-16 debut as a substitute replacing Demetrio Scopelliti in the 41st minute of a 1–0 home defeat against Turkey U-16. On 4 October 2012 he played his first entire match for Italy U-16, a 2–1 home win over Turkey U-16. On 27 August 2014, Taufer made his debut at U-17 level as a substitute replacing Alessandro Celestri in the 76th minute of a 0–0 home draw against Portugal U-17. On 29 August 2014 he played his first entire match at U-17 level, a 1–0 home win over Czech Republic U-17.

Career statistics

Club

References

External links
 

1998 births
People from Gondar
Ethiopian emigrants to Italy
Living people
Italian footballers
Italian sportspeople of African descent
Italy youth international footballers
Serie C players
Arzachena Academy Costa Smeralda players
Association football midfielders
Sportspeople from Amhara Region